Events from the year 1808 in the United States.

Incumbents

Federal Government 
 President: Thomas Jefferson (DR-Virginia)
 Vice President: George Clinton (DR-New York)
 Chief Justice: John Marshall (Virginia)
 Speaker of the House of Representatives: Joseph Bradley Varnum (DR-Massachusetts)
 Congress: 10th

Events
 January 1 – Act Prohibiting Importation of Slaves (1807) comes into effect: The importation of slaves into the United States is banned; this is also the earliest day under the United States Constitution that an amendment can be made restricting slavery.
 February 6 – The ship Topaz (from Boston April 5, 1807, hunting seals) rediscovers the Pitcairn Islands; only one HMS Bounty mutineer is found alive, Alexander Smith (John Adams).
 February 11 – Anthracite coal is first burned as fuel by Jesse Fell in Wilkes-Barre, Pennsylvania; the discovery leads to the use of coal as the key fuel source of America's industrial revolution.
 April 6 – John Jacob Astor founds the American Fur Company.
 April 24 – Irish Dominican R. Luke Concanen is consecrated first bishop of the newly erected Roman Catholic Diocese of New York (appointed April 8) but is unable to sail from Italy to America before his death in 1810 due to restrictions caused by the Napoleonic Wars.
 November – James Madison defeats Charles C. Pinckney in the U.S. presidential election.

Births
 January 6 – Joseph Pitty Couthouy, naval officer (died 1864)
 January 8 – John A. Poor,  lawyer, editor and railroad entrepreneur (died 1871)
 January 13 – Salmon P. Chase, 6th Chief Justice of the United States, 25th United States Secretary of the Treasury (died 1873)
 January 19 – Lysander Spooner, philosopher (died 1887)
 February 10 – John Edgar Thomson, civil engineer and railroad entrepreneur (died 1874)
 March 1 – Edward "Ned" Kendall, bandleader, instrumentalist (keyed bugle) (died 1861)
 March 14 – Narcissa Whitman, pioneer missionary (died 1847)
 May 6 – William Strong, politician, Associate Justice of the Supreme Court of the United States (died 1895)
 May 20 – Thomas D. Rice, actor and dancer (died 1860)
 June 3 – Jefferson Davis, President of the Confederate States from 1861 to 1865 and U.S. Senator from Mississippi from 1847 to 1851 and from 1857 to 1861 (died 1889)
 July 9 – Alexander William Doniphan, lawyer and military leader (died 1887)
 July 16 – Daniel Wells Jr., politician (died 1902)
 August 11 – William W. Chapman, politician and lawyer (died 1892)
 September 21 – Solon Borland, U.S. Senator from Arkansas from 1848 to 1853 (died 1864)
 September 29 – Henry Bennett, politician (died 1868)
 November 1 – John Taylor, 3rd President of the Church of Jesus Christ of Latter-day Saints (died 1887)
 November 29 – William F. Johnston, politician (died 1872)
 December 16 – Kinsley S. Bingham, U.S. Senator from Michigan from 1859 to 1861 (died 1861)
 December 29 – Andrew Johnson, 17th President of the United States from 1865 to 1869, 16th Vice President of the United States from March to April 1865 (died 1875)

Deaths
 February 14 – John Dickinson, Founding Father of the United States, signatory of Continental Association, Articles of Confederation, and United States Constitution (born 1732)
 May 18 – Elijah Craig, minister and inventor of bourbon whiskey (born 1738?)
 September 3 – John Montgomery, delegate to the Continental Congress (born 1722)
 September 17 – Benjamin Bourne, politician (born 1755)
 October 9 – John Claiborne, politician (born 1777)
 November 1 – Lewis Hallam Jr., actor (born c.1740 in England)

See also
Timeline of United States history (1790–1819)

References

Further reading
 S. Godon. Mineralogical Observations, Made in the Environs of Boston, in the Years 1807 and 1808. Memoirs of the American Academy of Arts and Sciences, Vol. 3, No. 1 (1809), pp. 127–154
 
 Secrets Reports of John Howe, 1808. The American Historical Review, Vol. 17, No. 2 (January 1912), pp. 332–354
 Samuel E. Morison. The First National Nominating Convention, 1808. The American Historical Review, Vol. 17, No. 4 (July 1912), pp. 744–763
 Victor O'Daniel. Concanen's Election to the See of New York (1808–10). The Catholic Historical Review, Vol. 2, No. 1 (April 1916), pp. 19–46
 
 Louis Martin Sears. Philadelphia and the Embargo of 1808. The Quarterly Journal of Economics, Vol. 35, No. 2 (February 1921), pp. 354–359
 William D. Hoyt Jr. Self-Portrait: Eliza Custis, 1808. The Virginia Magazine of History and Biography, Vol. 53, No. 2 (April 1945), pp. 89–100
 Richard R. Borneman. Franzoni and Andrei: Italian Sculptors in Baltimore, 1808. The William and Mary Quarterly, Third Series, Vol. 10, No. 1 (January 1953), pp. 108–111
 
 Noble E. Cunningham Jr. The Diary of Frances Few, 1808–1809. The Journal of Southern History, Vol. 29, No. 3 (August 1963), pp. 345–361
 Harry Ammon. James Monroe and the Election of 1808 in Virginia. The William and Mary Quarterly, Third Series, Vol. 20, No. 1 (January, 1963), pp. 33–56
 George L. Bilbe. A Digest of the Civil Laws Now in Force in the Territory of Orleans (1808). Louisiana History: The Journal of the Louisiana Historical Association, Vol. 14, No. 1 (Winter, 1973), pp. 104–108
 William G. McLoughlin. Thomas Jefferson and the Beginning of Cherokee Nationalism, 1806 to 1809. The William and Mary Quarterly, Third Series, Vol. 32, No. 4 (October, 1975), pp. 548–580
 Richard R. Beeman. Trade and Travel in Post-Revolutionary Virginia: A Diary of an Itinerant Peddler, 1807–1808. The Virginia Magazine of History and Biography, Vol. 84, No. 2 (April, 1976), pp. 174–188
 Jeffrey A. Frankel. The 1807–1809 Embargo Against Great Britain. The Journal of Economic History, Vol. 42, No. 2 (June 1982), pp. 291–308
 John M. Bryan. Robert Mills, Benjamin Henry Latrobe, Thomas Jefferson, and the South Carolina Penitentiary Project, 1806–1808. The South Carolina Historical Magazine, Vol. 85, No. 1 (January 1984), pp. 1–21
 Christopher McKee. Foreign Seamen in the United States Navy: A Census of 1808. The William and Mary Quarterly, Third Series, Vol. 42, No. 3 (July 1985), pp. 383–393
 Alan Taylor. "Stopping the Progres of Rogues and Deceivers": A White Indian Recruiting Notice of 1808. The William and Mary Quarterly, Third Series, Vol. 42, No. 1 (January 1985), pp. 90–103
 John Taylor, Wilson Cary Nicholas, David N. Mayer. Of Principles and Men: The Correspondence of John Taylor of Caroline with Wilson Cary Nicholas 1806–1808. The Virginia Magazine of History and Biography, Vol. 96, No. 3, "The Example of Virginia Is a Powerful Thing": The Old Dominion and the Constitution, 1788–1988 (July 1988), pp. 345–388
 James M. O'Toole. From Advent to Easter: Catholic Preaching in New York City, 1808–1809. Church History, Vol. 63, No. 3 (September, 1994), pp. 365–377

External links
 

 
1800s in the United States
United States
United States
Years of the 19th century in the United States